Benjamin Cooper Ford (born August 15, 1975) is a former Major League Baseball right-handed pitcher for the Arizona Diamondbacks, New York Yankees, and Milwaukee Brewers.

Drafted by the New York Yankees in the 20th round of the 1994 Major League Baseball Draft, Ford would make his Major League Baseball debut with the Arizona Diamondbacks on August 20, . Ford appeared in his last major league game on September 26, . Ford gave up home run 661 to Barry Bonds on April 13, 2004.

Ford was a member of the inaugural Arizona Diamondbacks team that began play in Major League Baseball in 1998.

External links

Baseball players from Iowa
1975 births
Living people
Arizona Diamondbacks players
New York Yankees players
Milwaukee Brewers players
Major League Baseball pitchers
Gulf Coast Yankees players
Oneonta Yankees players
Greensboro Bats players
Tampa Yankees players
Tucson Sidewinders players
Columbus Clippers players
Iowa Cubs players
Arizona League Cubs players
Indianapolis Indians players
American expatriate baseball players in Australia